Father Brown (German: Pater Brown) is a West German mystery television series which aired between 1966 and 1972 on ARD. It is based on the Father Brown stories of British writer G.K. Chesterton, about a crime-solving Catholic priest. The title role was played by the Austrian actor Josef Meinrad. Ernst Fritz Fürbringer had a recurring role as Inspector Gilbert Burns in 19 episodes, while Guido Wieland played another police officer Inspector Evans in 10 episodes.

The first two series were shot in monochrome, before production then switched to colour.

Guest cast
Actors who appeared in individual episodes of the series include Viktor Staal, Albert Lieven, Astrid Frank, Dieter Borsche, Eckart Dux, Karin Hübner, Wolfgang Lukschy, Christiane Nielsen, Christian Wolff, Alexander Hegarth, Karl John, Diana Körner, Klaus Löwitsch, Ilona Grübel, Joachim Hansen, Michael Hinz, Carl Lange, Werner Pochath, Hans Quest, Claus Biederstaedt, Alexander Kerst, Ruth-Maria Kubitschek, Gerd Baltus, Rudolf Schündler, Hans Korte, Peter Capell, Ellen Umlauf, Helma Seitz, Hilde Weissner and Werner Peters.

References

Bibliography

 Martin Compart. Crime TV: Lexikon der Krimi-Serien. Bertz + Fischer, 2000.

External links
 

1966 German television series debuts
1972 German television series endings
1960s German television series
1960s crime television series
1970s crime television series
German-language television shows
German crime television series